Osowa Sień  (German: Röhrsdorf) is a village in the administrative district of Gmina Wschowa, within Wschowa County, Lubusz Voivodeship, in western Poland.

Etymology 

The current name of the village is literally a house in the aspen and appears in Polish historical sources also as Ossowa Sień or Ossowasień. The German name is derived from the name of a German settler Rüdiger and occurs in older versions as Rüdigersdorf or later shortened Röhrsdorf.

Heritage 

The first mention of the village dates from 1325, when it was called Rudegeri Villa.

The Church of St. Fabian and St. Sebastian, built in the 14th century, is the oldest historical building in Osowa Sień.  It is a single-aisle building, made of stone with a use of bricks. Baroque interior comes from the 18th century. Inside there is as well the sculpture of Christ from the 16th century and the Renaissance tombstones of a former landlords from Żychliński and Ossowski family.

In the village there is also the neoclassical palace complex built between 1890-1904 and Classicist manor from the beginning of the 19th century, both surrounded by large park areas.

Notable residents
 Leonie Ossowski (1925–2019); author

References

Bibliography 

 Martin Sprungala: Wsie na pograniczu głogowsko-wielkopolskim. Zarys dziejów wybranych miejscowości. Sława - Wijewo 2010, 

Villages in Wschowa County